Camilli is an Italian surname, may refer to:
Camillo Camilli
Carlo Camilli, Italian footballer
Dolph Camilli, American baseball player
Doug Camilli, American baseball player
Lou Camilli, American baseball player
Frankie Campbell (born Francisco Camilli), American boxer

See also
Cəmilli (disambiguation)

Italian-language surnames